Vasile Ionel Măstăcan (born 5 November 1968) is a retired Romanian rower who competed at the 1992, 1996 and 2000 Olympics. He had his best achievements in the eights, winning an Olympic silver medal in 1992 and the world title in 2001.

References

External links
 

1968 births
Living people
Romanian male rowers
Olympic rowers of Romania
Rowers at the 1992 Summer Olympics
Rowers at the 1996 Summer Olympics
Rowers at the 2000 Summer Olympics
Olympic silver medalists for Romania
Olympic medalists in rowing
World Rowing Championships medalists for Romania
Medalists at the 1992 Summer Olympics